Teo Chee Hean (born 27 December 1954) is a Singaporean politician and former two-star rear-admiral who has been serving as Senior Minister of Singapore since 2019 and Coordinating Minister for National Security since 2015. A member of the governing People's Action Party, he has been the Member of Parliament (MP) representing the Pasir Ris West division of Pasir Ris–Punggol GRC since 2001.

A recipient of the President's Scholarship and Singapore Armed Forces Overseas Scholarship, Teo served in the Republic of Singapore Navy (RSN) between 1972 and 1992, and attained the rank Rear-Admiral (Two-Star). He served as Chief of Navy between 1991 and 1992 before leaving the Navy and entering politics.

He made his political debut in the 1992 by-election in Marine Parade GRC as part of a four-member PAP team. He had served as Deputy Prime Minister between 2009 and 2019, Minister for the Environment between 1995 and 1997, Minister for Education between 1997 and 2003, Minister for Defence between 2003 and 2011 and Minister for Home Affairs between 2011 and 2015. Teo was part of the ministerial committee of the Smart Nation and Digital Government Group (SNDGG). As Senior Minister, Teo had served as acting prime minister in several occasions, during Prime Minister Lee Hsien Loong's absence.

Within the PAP, Teo was First Assistant Secretary-General in the party's Central Executive Committee (CEC) before he was succeeded by Heng Swee Keat in November 2018.

Education
Teo was educated at St. Joseph's Institution before he was awarded the President's Scholarship and Singapore Armed Forces Overseas Scholarship in 1973. He graduated from the University of Manchester in 1976 with a Bachelor of Science with first class honours degree in electrical engineering and management science.

He subsequently went on to complete a Master of Science with distinction degree in computing science at Imperial College London in 1977. He also completed a Master of Public Administration degree at Harvard Kennedy School in 1986, where he was named a Littauer Fellow.

Career

Military career
Teo joined in the Singapore Armed Forces (SAF) in 1972 and was commissioned as a naval officer at the SAFTI Military Institute in 1973. He went on to hold various command and staff appointments in the Republic of Singapore Navy (RSN) and the Joint Staff before his appointment as Chief of Navy in 1991 with the rank of Rear-Admiral (Two-Star) before leaving the SAF on 7 December 1992 to contest in the 1992 by-elections in Marine Parade GRC.

Political career
Teo made his political debut in the 1992 by-elections in Marine Parade GRC as part of a four-member PAP team led by Prime Minister Goh Chok Tong. After the PAP team won 72.9% of the vote against three opposition parties, Teo was elected as the Member of Parliament (MP) representing the Joo Chiat ward of Marine Parade GRC. He was subsequently appointed as Minister of State for Finance, Minister of State for Communications and Minister of State for Defence.

In April 1995, Teo was appointed as Senior Minister of State for Defence and Acting Minister for the Environment. In January 1996, he was promoted to full Minister and given the Cabinet portfolios of Minister for the Environment and Second Minister for Defence.

Teo switched to contesting in Pasir Ris GRC during the 1997 general election and the four-member PAP team led by him won 70.9% of the vote against the Workers' Party. Teo thus elected as the MP representing the Pasir Ris Loyang ward of Pasir Ris GRC. In subsequent Cabinet reshuffles, he became Minister for Education while continuing to serve as Second Minister for Defence.

During the 2001 general election, Teo led the five-member PAP team contesting in the newly formed Pasir Ris–Punggol GRC and won an uncontested walkover. After winning the general election, he continued to hold his previous Cabinet portfolios while becoming the MP representing the Pasir Ris West ward of Pasir Ris–Punggol GRC. On 1 August 2003, Teo was appointed as Minister for Defence and Minister-in-charge of the Civil Service.

During the 2006 general election, Teo led a six-member PAP team to contest in Pasir–Ris Punggol GRC again and won 68.7% of the vote against the Singapore Democratic Alliance. He retained his parliamentary seat and continued holding his Cabinet portfolios. On 1 April 2009, Teo was appointed as one of two Deputy Prime Ministers, in addition to his portfolios as Minister for Defence and Minister-in-charge of the Civil Service.

Teo led a six-member PAP team to contest in Pasir–Ris Punggol GRC in the 2011 general election and won 64.79% of the vote against the Singapore Democratic Alliance. On 18 May 2011, Teo relinquished his Cabinet portfolio of Minister for Defence and took up the positions of Minister for Home Affairs and Coordinating Minister for National Security, while concurrently serving as Deputy Prime Minister and Minister-in-charge of the Civil Service.

On 1 May 2019, Teo relinquished his appointment as Deputy Prime Minister to become a Senior Minister, while retaining his position as Coordinating Minister for National Security. In his new role, he also oversaw four departments under the Prime Minister's Office; Smart Nation and Digital Government Group, National Security Coordination Secretariat, National Population and Talent Division, and the National Climate Change Secretariat.

Personal life
Teo was married to Chew Poh Yim, who was the director of the business consultancy and part-time marketing management at Nanyang Polytechnic's School of Business Management. Chew graduated from the University of Manchester Institute of Science and Technology in 1977 with a Bachelor of Science with honours degree in biochemistry. In 2015, she founded Stroke Support Station, a volunteering organisation that provides assistance to stroke survivors and caregivers. Chew died on 31 October 2021 at the age of 67. The couple have one son and one daughter.

Teo was also President of the Singapore National Olympic Council (SNOC) between 1984 and 2014, and an advisor to the Singapore Dragon Boat Association.

References

Bibliography
  Liu, Changping & Zhang, He, 风雨晚晴园(不应忘却的辛亥革命勋臣张永福), 中国文史 (2011),

External links

 Teo Chee Hean on Singapore Prime Minister's Office
 Teo Chee Hean on Parliament of Singapore
 
 

|-

|-

1954 births
Living people
Alumni of the University of London
Alumni of the Department of Computing, Imperial College London
Alumni of the University of Manchester Institute of Science and Technology
Deputy Prime Ministers of Singapore
Environment ministers of Singapore
Ministers for Defence of Singapore
Members of the Parliament of Singapore
People's Action Party politicians
President's Scholars
Recipients of the Olympic Order
Saint Joseph's Institution, Singapore alumni
Singaporean people of Teochew descent
Harvard Kennedy School alumni
Chiefs of the Republic of Singapore Navy
Ministers for Education of Singapore
Ministers for Home Affairs of Singapore
Members of the Cabinet of Singapore